Anna Gavriushenko (born 25 May 1982) is a Kazakhstani sprinter who specializes in the 400 metres. Her personal best time is 52.88 seconds, achieved in May 2004 in Bishkek.

Competition record

References

1982 births
Living people
Kazakhstani female sprinters
Competitors at the 2005 Summer Universiade
Competitors at the 2007 Summer Universiade
20th-century Kazakhstani women
21st-century Kazakhstani women